The 2006–07 season was the 101st season in the existence of AJ Auxerre and the club's 27th consecutive season in the top-flight of French football. In addition to the domestic league, Auxerre participated in this season's editions of the Coupe de France, the Coupe de la Ligue, the UEFA Intertoto Cup and UEFA Cup.

First-team squad
Squad at end of season

Left club during season

Competitions

Overall record

Ligue 1

League table

Results summary

Results by round

Matches

Coupe de France

Coupe de la Ligue

Intertoto Cup

Third round

UEFA Cup

Second qualifying round

First round

Group stage

Notes and references

Notes

References

AJ Auxerre
AJ Auxerre seasons